Giordano Bruno (1548–1600) was an Italian philosopher and mystic.

Giordano Bruno may also refer to:
 Giordano Bruno (crater), a crater on the Moon
 Giordano Bruno (film), a 1973 film by Giuliano Montaldo

See also 
 5148 Giordano, asteroid
 Bruno Giordano (born 1956), Italian soccer player
 Bruno Giordano (politician) (born 1954), Italian politician
 Giordano Bruno and the Hermetic Tradition, the 1964 non-fiction book by Frances A. Yates
 Giordano Bruno Foundation, a non-profit foundation based in Germany
 Statue of Giordano Bruno, a statue in the Campo de' Fiori in Rome